HanWay Films is an independent British international sales, distribution and marketing company specializing in theatrical feature films.

History
In 1999, Jeremy Thomas founded international sales company HanWay Films with his colleagues Peter Watson (Deputy Chairman) and Stephan Mallmann, and continues to Chair the board. Two new members joined the board in 2011, Thorsten Schumacher, previously Head of Sales, was appointed Managing Director, and former Head of Business Affairs Jan Spielhoff took up the reins as Chief Operating Officer.

HanWay has established itself as leading international sales, distribution and marketing company specialising in high-profile quality films from worldwide talent. HanWay arranges financing, sales and distribution for all films from Recorded Picture Company, along with projects from third party producers.

HanWay also represents an extensive film catalogue of over 500 features including films from Thomas's Recorded Picture Company, and the British Film Institute. Representing the very best in film-making talent, these include productions by Woody Allen, Takeshi Kitano, Bernardo Bertolucci, Wim Wenders, Terry Gilliam, David Cronenberg, Peter Greenaway, Jean-Luc Godard, David Mamet, Miloš Forman, Stephen Frears, Phillip Noyce and Nagisa Ōshima.

Productions
HanWay's productions include Thomas' production of David Cronenberg's A Dangerous Method starring Keira Knightley, Viggo Mortensen, Michael Fassbender and Vincent Cassel, in the true-life story of the young Dr. Jung, his mentor Freud and the beautiful patient that came between them; Lone Scherfig’s coming-of-age drama An Education, which won Carey Mulligan a BAFTA award for Best Actress; James Gunn’s pop-culture actioner Super starring Rainn Wilson, Elliot Page and Liv Tyler, from producer Ted Hope; Nigel Cole’s Made in Dagenham starring Golden Globe nominee Sally Hawkins from producer Stephen Woolley, and Andrea Arnold’s adaptation of the romantic classic Wuthering Heights.

Other films handled include Nowhere Boy, a film by artist Sam Taylor-Wood based on John Lennon’s teenage years starring Aaron Johnson; Gurinder Chadha’s culinary black comedy It's a Wonderful Afterlife which premiered at the 2010 Sundance Film Festival, Harry Brown starring Academy Award winner Michael Caine; Scott Hicks’ Australian-set drama The Boys Are Back starring Clive Owen; Irish comedy Perrier's Bounty, starring Cillian Murphy and Academy Award winner Jim Broadbent; and Danis Tanović’s Triage, with Colin Farrell in the lead. Theatrical documentary releases include Julien Temple’s Oil City Confidential, and Mugabe and the White African.

Other releases include Jon Amiel's Creation starring Paul Bettany and Jennifer Connelly (produced by Thomas), which opened the 2009 Toronto International Film Festival, Sunshine Cleaning starring Amy Adams and Emily Blunt; Gerald McMorrow’s Franklyn starring Eva Green, Ryan Phillippe and Sam Riley (produced by Thomas), Christopher Smith’s period thriller Black Death starring Sean Bean, and Michael Winterbottom’s Genova starring Colin Firth.

The company also handled Takashi Miike’s samurai epic Thirteen Assassins, and Jerzy Skolimowski's political thriller Essential Killing, both executive-produced by Thomas. Both films premiered at the 67th Venice International Film Festival, and Essential Killing went on to win the Special Jury Prize, Best Actor for Vincent Gallo (the Volpi Cup), and the Cinemavenniere Award for Best Film in Competition (voted by a youth jury). Upcoming productions include films by David Cronenberg, Terry Gilliam and Phillip Noyce.

The company has previously handled such titles as Woody Allen’s Match Point, starring Scarlett Johansson, Julian Jarrold’s Becoming Jane starring Anne Hathaway and James McAvoy, and Sarah Polley’s multi-Academy Award nominated Away from Her starring Julie Christie.

In its capacity as international sales agent, HanWay works closely with Ecosse Films.

HanWay Films represents collections from the British Film Institute, Merchant Ivory, Peter Weir, Wim Wenders, Phillip Noyce, Jean Doumanian, Alex Cox, Paul Cox, New Zealand Film Commission, Manoel de Oliveira and Recorded Picture Company, comprising some 500 feature films, documentaries and animations. This collection includes films from noted world cinema figures, including Woody Allen, Bernardo Bertolucci, David Cronenberg, Clint Eastwood, Miloš Forman, Stephen Frears, Terry Gilliam, Alfred Hitchcock, James Ivory, Takeshi Kitano, Bob Rafelson, Terence Davies, David Mamet, Martin Scorsese, and Ridley Scott.

With Carol, Brooklyn and Anomalisa, managing director Thorsten Schumacher announced 2015 as "the most successful year for [HanWay Films] to date."

Team

Executive Board
Jeremy Thomas - Chairman
Peter Watson - Vice Chairman
Joseph Jeffreys - Executive Assistant
Marie-Gabrielle Stewart - Managing Director

Marketing and Publicity
Tom Grievson - Head of Marketing and Distribution
Tejinder Jouhal - Director of Marketing and Distribution
Joseph Hewitt - Marketing Manager

Sales
Nicole Mackey - Head of Sales
Mark Lane - Director of Sales 
Marta Ravani - Director of Sales, HanWay The Collections

Acquisitions
Matthew Baker - Director of Acquisitions

Business Affairs & Finance
Justin Kelly - Head of Business & Legal Affairs
Beverley Cullen - Contracts Manager
Elizabeth Kormanova - Director of Business Affairs
Ivan Kelava - Senior Business Affairs Manager
Rachel Barbut - Financial Controller
Siu Lee - Assistant Accountant
Gareth Melia - Assistant Accountant

Films

1999
 Just Looking 
 Story of a Bad Boy 
 Women Talking Dirty 
 Sunburn
 The Cup 
 Buena Vista Social Club

2000
 Help! I'm a Fish
 Brother 
 Innocence

2001
 Lotte Reiniger 
 The Mystic Masseur 
 The Diaries of Vaslav Nijinsky 
 The Triumph of Love 
 Love the Hard Way 
 The Last Minute

2002
 Junimond 
 Half the Rent 
 Serving Sara 
 Revengers Tragedy 
 Lost in La Mancha 
 Rabbit-Proof Fence

2003
 House of Sand and Fog 
 The Boys from County Clare 
 Festival Express 
 Travellers and Magicians
 The Dreamers 
 Danny Deckchair 
 The Soul of a Man 
 Young Adam 
 To Kill a King 
 Fools 
 All the Real Girls

2004
 Night of Truth
 It's All Gone Pete Tong 
 Human Touch
 Land of Plenty 
 Promised Land
 Egoshooter 
 Creep
 The Football Factory 
 Derek Jarman: Life as Art
 Boo, Zino & the Snurks

2005
 Dreaming Lhasa 
 Brothers of the Head 
 Tideland 
 Magic Mirror 
 Don't Come Knocking
 Match Point 
 The Devil and Daniel Johnston

2006
 Goya's Ghosts  	
 Anger Me
 Away from Her
 Belle Toujours
 Impy's Island
 Scoop
 Severance
 Fast Food Nation
 Samoan Wedding
 A Woman in Winter 
 Kidulthood 
 Glastonbury

2007
 Battle for Haditha
 Never Apologize
 Mister Lonely
 Control
 Moving Midway
 Becoming Jane
 Kaluapapa Heavan
 Joe Strummer: The Future Is Unwritten

2008
 A Bunch of Amateurs
 Franklyn 
 Salvation
 Genova
 Is Anybody There? 
 Brideshead Revisited 
 Palermo Shooting 
 Of Time and the City 
 Impy's Island 
 Sunshine Cleaning 
 Two Fists, One Heart

2009
 Nowhere Boy
 Oil City Confidential 
 Beyond the Pole 
 The Boys Are Back 
 Harry Brown
 Triage
 Perrier's Bounty
 Creation 
 Mugabe and the White African 
 Empire of Silver
 An Education

2010
 Robinson in Ruins 
 Made in Dagenham 
 Super
 13 Assassins
 Essential Killing
 Chico and Rita
 Black Death
 Thunder Soul
 It's a Wonderful Afterlife

2011
 Diana Vreeland: The Eye Has to Travel 
 Roman Polanski: A Film Memoir
 You're Next 
 Wuthering Heights 
 Shame
 A Dangerous Method
 Hara-Kiri: Death of a Samurai
 The Decoy Bride
 TT3D: Closer to the Edge 
 Pina 
 Life in a Day 
 Being Elmo: A Puppeteer's Journey

2012
 Great Expectations 
 Quartet
 Seven Psychopaths
 Kon-Tiki 
 Woody Allen: A Documentary 
 Me and You 
 Anton Corbijn

2013
 Vara: A Blessing
 Finding Vivian Maier
 Dom Hemingway 
 The Unknown Known 
 Tracks 
 Only Lovers Left Alive 
 Seduced and Abandoned 
 All Is Bright 
 Houston 
 Dirty Wars

2014
 20,000 Days on Earth
 God Help the Girl
 The Guest
 The Riot Club

2015
 Anomalisa
 Brooklyn
 Carol 
 Every Thing Will Be Fine
 High-Rise
 Tale of Tales

2016
 The Limehouse Golem
 Their Finest

2017
 How to Talk to Girls at Parties
 Mary Shelley
 A Prayer Before Dawn

2018
 Colette
 Monsters and Men
 The Hummingbird Project

2019
 Impy's Island
 The Kindness of Strangers
 The Wolf Hour
 Roads
 Pavarotti
 The Burnt Orange Hersey

2020 

 Made in Italy
 Wild Mountain Thyme
 The Roads Not Taken
 Crock of Gold: A Few Rounds with Shane MacGowen

2021 

Music
 Falling
 Minamata
 Land
 Seance
 The Card Counter

Upcoming
 McCarthy
You Really Got Me

References

External links 
 Official site
 HanWay Films at BFI

Entertainment companies established in 1999
British companies established in 1999
Film distributors of the United Kingdom
International sales agents